Odontoglossum gloriosum, the glorious odontoglossum, is a species of orchid endemic to Colombia.

gloriosum